Raffaele Russo (born 25 February 1999) is an Italian football player who plays as a forward for  club Avellino.

Club career

Napoli 
Born in Capua, Russo was a youth exponent of Napoli.

Loan to Albissola 
On 21 July 2018, Russo was signed by Serie C side Albissola on a season-long loan deal. On 19 September he made his professional debut in Serie C for Albissola as a substitute replacing Amir Mahrous in the 71st minute of a 3–2 home defeat against Olbia. On 21 October he played his first match as a starter for Albissola, a 2–0 away defeat against Arezzo, he was replaced by Guido Bennati in the 90th minute. One week later he played his first entire match, a 1–1 home draw against Pro Patria. On 30 March, Russo was sent-off with a red card, as a substitute, in the 95th minute of a 1–0 home defeat against Pisa. Russo ended his loan to Albissola with 22 appearances, including 7 as a starter, and 2 assists.

Loan to Pro Vercelli and Rieti 
After extended his contract for another year of contract, plus two more optionable, on 14 August 2019, Russo was loaned to Serie C club Pro Vercelli on a season-long loan deal. Two weeks later, on 25 August, Russo made his debut for the club as a substitute replacing Matteo Della Morte in the 71st minute of a 2–0 home win over Pianese. However, in January 2020, his loan was terminated by Pro Vercelli and he returned to Napoli leaving the club with only 9 appearances in the league (all as substitute), he also remained an unused substitute for other 6 matches during the loan.

On 9 January 2020, Russo was signed by Serie C side Rieti on a 6-month loan deal. Two days later, on 11 January he made his debut for the club as a substitute replacing Pasquale De Sarlo in the 62nd minute of a 1–0 home defeat against Picerno. One week later, on 19 January, he played his first entire match for Rieti, a 5–2 away defeat against Bari. On 26 January he scored his first professional goal for Rieti in the 60th minute of a 1–0 home win over Casertana. Russo ended his loan to Rieti with 9 appearances, 1 goal and 1 assist, however Rieti was relegated in Serie D.

Loan to Grosseto
On 24 September 2020, he joined newly promoted Serie C club Grosseto. Three days later, on 27 September he made his debut for the club as a substitute replacing Filippo Moscati in the 75th minute of a 2–0 away win over Piacenza. On 11 October, Russo played his first match as a starter for Grosseto, a 2–1 away win over Pergolettese, he was replaced by Filippo Boccardi after 54 minutes. On 28 March 2021, Russo played his first entire match for the club, a 1–0 away defeat against Novara. On 25 April he was sent-off with a double yellow card in the 42nd minute of a 1–0 away win over Pistoiese. Russo ended his season-long loan to Grosseto with 28 appearances, only 7 of them as a starter, and 1 assist, he also helped the club to reach the play-off, however the club was eliminated by AlbinoLeffe in the second round.

Avellino
On 11 July 2022, Russo signed a two-year contract with Avellino.

Career statistics

Club

References

External links 
 

1999 births
Living people
People from Capua
Footballers from Campania
Italian footballers
Association football forwards
Serie C players
S.S.C. Napoli players
Albissola 2010 players
F.C. Pro Vercelli 1892 players
F.C. Rieti players
U.S. Grosseto 1912 players
A.C.R. Messina players
U.S. Avellino 1912 players
Sportspeople from the Province of Caserta